In mathematics, specifically abstract algebra, an Artinian ring (sometimes Artin ring) is a ring that satisfies the descending chain condition on (one-sided) ideals; that is, there is no infinite descending sequence of ideals. Artinian rings are named after Emil Artin, who first discovered that the descending chain condition for ideals simultaneously generalizes finite rings and rings that are finite-dimensional vector spaces over fields. The definition of Artinian rings may be restated by interchanging the descending chain condition with an equivalent notion: the minimum condition.

Precisely, a ring is left Artinian if it satisfies the descending chain condition on left ideals, right Artinian if it satisfies the descending chain condition on right ideals, and Artinian or two-sided Artinian if it is both left and right Artinian.  For commutative rings the left and right definitions coincide, but in general they are distinct from each other.

The Artin–Wedderburn theorem characterizes every simple Artinian ring as a ring of matrices over a division ring.  This implies that a simple ring is left Artinian if and only if it is right Artinian.

The same definition and terminology can be applied to modules, with ideals replaced by submodules.

Although the descending chain condition appears dual to the ascending chain condition, in rings it is in fact the stronger condition.  Specifically, a consequence of the Akizuki–Hopkins–Levitzki theorem is that a left (resp. right) Artinian ring is automatically a left (resp. right) Noetherian ring.  This is not true for general modules; that is, an Artinian module need not be a Noetherian module.

Examples and counterexamples 
An integral domain is Artinian if and only if it is a field.
A ring with finitely many, say left, ideals is left Artinian. In particular, a finite ring (e.g.) is left and right Artinian.
Let k be a field. Then  is Artinian for every positive integer n.
Similarly,  is an Artinian ring with maximal ideal .
If I is a nonzero ideal of a Dedekind domain A, then  is a principal Artinian ring.
For each , the full matrix ring  over a left Artinian (resp. left Noetherian) ring R is left Artinian (resp. left Noetherian).

The following two are examples of non-Artinian rings.
In contrast, if R is Noetherian so is R[x] by the Hilbert basis theorem.
The ring of integers  is a Noetherian ring but is not Artinian.

Modules over Artinian rings 
Let M be a left module over a left Artinian ring. Then the following are equivalent (Hopkins' theorem): (i) M is finitely generated, (ii) M has finite length (i.e., has composition series), (iii) M is Noetherian, (iv) M is Artinian.

Commutative Artinian rings 
Let A be a commutative Noetherian ring with unity. Then the following are equivalent.
A is Artinian.
A is a finite product of commutative Artinian local rings.
A / nil(A) is a semisimple ring, where nil(A) is the nilradical of A.
 Every finitely generated module over A has finite length. (see above)
A has Krull dimension zero. (In particular, the nilradical is the Jacobson radical since prime ideals are maximal.)
 is finite and discrete.
 is discrete.

Let k be a field and A finitely generated k-algebra. Then A is Artinian if and only if A is finitely generated as k-module.

An Artinian local ring is complete. A quotient and localization of an Artinian ring is Artinian.

Simple Artinian ring 
A simple Artinian ring A is a matrix ring over a division ring. Indeed, let I be a minimal (nonzero) right ideal of A. Then, since  is a two-sided ideal,  since A is simple. Thus, we can choose  so that . Assume k is minimal with respect that property. Consider the map of right A-modules:

It is surjective. If it is not injective, then, say,  with nonzero . Then, by the minimality of I, we have: . It follows:

,

which contradicts the minimality of k. Hence,  and thus .

See also
 Artin algebra
 Artinian ideal
 Serial module
 Semiperfect ring
 Gorenstein ring
 Noetherian ring

Notes

References

 
 Charles Hopkins. Rings with minimal condition for left ideals.  Ann. of Math. (2)  40,  (1939). 712–730.

 
 

Ring theory